William or Bill Newton may refer to:

Entertainment
 William Newton (poet) (1750–1830), English poet, the Peak Minstrel from Derbyshire
 William John Newton (1785–1869), English miniature-painter
 Frankie Newton (William Frank Newton, 1906–1954), American jazz trumpeter
 William Newton (novelist), pseudonym of Kenneth Newton (1927–2010), English doctor
 William Arnold Newton (1965–1990), actor and producer of gay erotic films

Military
 Bill Newton (William Ellis Newton, 1919–1943), Australian recipient of the Victoria Cross
 William Newton (British Army officer) (died 1730), brigadier-general

Politics
 William Newton (MP for Dorchester) (died 1453), English MP for Dorchester
 William Newton (MP for Ipswich) (1783–1862), English MP for Ipswich
 William Newton (Mauritian politician) (1842–1915), Mauritian barrister, politician and MP

Sports
 William Newton (footballer) (1900–1965), English soccer player
 William Newton (sport shooter), British Olympic shooter

Other
 William Newton (architect, 1730–1798), English architect
 William Newton (architect, 1735–1790), English architect
 William Newton (priest) (1843–1914), American Episcopalian priest and author
 William Newton (trade unionist) (1822–1876), English trade unionist, journalist, and Chartist

See also
William Newton Byers (1831–1903), American founding figure of Omaha, Nebraska
William Newton-Smith (born 1943), Anglo-Canadian philosopher of science
Billy Newton-Davis (born 1951), Canadian singer-songwriter
Bill Newton Dunn (born 1941), British politician in the European Parliament
Williams Newton (1893–1970), American football and baseball coach